Manuel Miguel de Lardizábal y Uribe (1744–1820) was a Novohispanic penologist who was an academician of the Real Academia Española de la Lengua from 1775 to 1820. He seems to have been the successor to chair C of his father in law, Academician from 1746 to 1775 Francisco Antonio de Angulo.

King Charles III of Spain tried in 1764 to bring back a law of 1734 by his father King Philip V of Spain whereby even thieves operating in Madrid could be tried and executed even if no murder was involved in the thieving. The royal council pointed out to him that either victims or witnesses would default collaboration with Justice by the general popular feeling that the punishment could be disproportionate with people robbing only money, jewels, etc. while saving the lives of the persons being robbed. The King was thus obliged to keep his ideas on public order to himself and/or educated listeners.

Further, lawyer Acevedo published in 1770 a dissertation against torture, as being in conflict with Nature Rights and public decency within the Social Body. The lawyer politician from Zaragoza, Manuel de Roda y Arrieta, managed to get Charles III and his Royal Council deliberating around changes into the Penal Legislation, whereby capital punishment and/or extensive terms rotting in prisons could better be modified to convicts performing useful works needed by the public interest.

These moves, prior to 1776, where the king and his royal council echoed letters of intent dated 1776 through reflections on the significant works by Cesare Beccaria, brought about the publication in 1782 by Manuel de Lardizábal of his Discurso sobre las penas contrahido a las leyes criminales de España para facilitar su reforma. He cites Frenchman Montesquieu, Guillaume-François Le Trosne, with his Réflexions sur la réforme de la legislation universelle, the German Samuel von Pufendorf, the Dutch Hugo Grotius, the Italian Beccaria, and the reflections on the degradation applying torture of the Frenchman Joseph Michel Antoine Servan.

References

https://web.archive.org/web/20080526002202/http://www.euskosare.org/komunitateak/ikertzaileak/ehmg_2_mintegia/txostenak/miguel_lardizabal_uribe/
María Cristina Torales Pacheco, (Univ. Interamericana, México): "Los vascos en la Nueva España del siglo XVIII", en Boletín de la Real Sociedad Bascongada de los Amigos del País, España XLIX, 1993, p. 81–97.
María Cristina Torales Pacheco, (Univ. Interamericana, México): "Ilustrados en la Nueva España, los socios de la Real Sociedad Bascongada de los Amigos del País, (abrev. RSBAP), México", - Colegio de San Ignacio Loyola-UIA; 2001, 517 pp.
Carlos Gonzalez Echegaray. "Miguel de Lardizábal, Diputado por Indias y Regente de España”, en Los Vascos en la Hispanidad, Bilbao, Diputación de Vizcaya, 1964, p. 103–109.
Cesare Beccaria, Dei delitti e delle pene, Fondo de Cultura Económica Ed., 328 pages, (2007), Mexico.

1744 births
1820 deaths
Philosophers of law
Writers from Tlaxcala
Members of the Royal Spanish Academy
18th-century Spanish writers
18th-century male writers
18th-century Mexican writers